East Brisbane is an inner southern suburb of the City of Brisbane, Queensland, Australia.

Geography

It is mostly residential, with some small commercial areas, and has many original Queenslander houses.

East Brisbane is bounded by the median of the Brisbane River to the north, Norman Park to the east, Coorparoo to the south-east, Woolloongabba to the south-west, and Kangaroo Point to the north-west. The border between Norman Park and most of Coorparoo follows Norman Creek.

Major roads include Lytton Road, Wellington Road, and Latrobe Street in the north, and Vulture Street and Stanley Street in the south of the suburb. The eastern side of the suburb rises to a small hill with some views over Woolloongabba and the CBD and falls away to Norman Creek.

History
The significant housing areas in East Brisbane were founded during the Brisbane property boom of the 1880s. For example, one such development was the Heathfield Estate, which was released in 1886.

East Brisbane State School opened on 10 July 1899, following the official opening ceremony on 8 July 1899. The school celebrated its 50th anniversary with a jubilee carnival in November 1949.

In 1881, 232 blocks of land were advertised as Longlands Estate to be auctioned on 26 November 1881 by auctioneer David Love. The estate covers an area now in East Brisbane, including Fisher, Longlands and Norman Street.

In 1886, blocks of land were advertised as East Woolloongabba  to be auctioned on 6 November 1886 by Arthur Martin & Co. auctioneers.

Brisbane East State School opened on 10 July 1899. It was later renamed East Brisbane State School.

Langlands Estate, a subdivision of 1289 allotments, was advertised for auction on 13 July 1889 by Dansie & Chandler auctioneers.

Mowbray Park, a large park alongside the Brisbane River, was established in 1904. On 24 January 1920 swimming baths in the Brisbane River was created alongside the park. The baths were closed in August 1940 due to poor water quality because sewage was being pumped into the Brisbane River at Pinkenba downstream but due to the river being tidal it could be carried upstream to East Brisbane.

Church of England Grammar School (informally known as Churchie) opened on 8 February 1912. It was subsequently renamed Anglican Church Grammar School.

St Benedict's Catholic Primary School opened on 20 January 1928 behind St Benedict's Catholic Church at 81 Mowbray Avenue. It closed in 1971.

Until 13 April 1969 electric trams operated by the Brisbane City Council served the suburb, running along Stanley Street from Woolloongabba, into Lisburn, Elfin and Latrobe Street and thence into Lytton Road, and on to Bulimba. Trolley-buses, also operated by the City Council operated along Stanley Street until March.

At the  East Brisbane had a population of 5,598 people.

Landmarks

Major landmarks in East Brisbane include Mowbray Park, Heath Park, and Anglican Church Grammar School.

Heritage listings 

East Brisbane has a number of heritage-listed sites, including:

 59 Heath Street: Kitawah
 56 Laidlaw Parade: Eskgrove
 58 Latrobe Street: La Trobe
 33, 60 & 78 Lytton Road: Mowbray Park and East Brisbane War Memorial
 109 Lytton Road: Hanworth
 22-28 Mowbray Terrace: Mowbraytown Presbyterian Church
81 Mowbray Terrace: St Benedict's Catholic Church
20 Norman Street: former East Brisbane Primitive Methodist Churches
 58 Stafford Street: Hester Villa
 963 Stanley Street: Classic Cinema / Triumph Cinema
 554 Vulture Street East: St Paul's Anglican Church
 90 Wellington Road: East Brisbane State School

Education
East Brisbane State School is a government primary (Prep-6) school for boys and girls at 56 Wellington Road. In 2017, the school had an enrolment of 212 students with 20 teachers (16 full-time equivalent) and 14 non-teaching staff (8 full-time equivalent).

Anglican Church Grammar School is a private primary and secondary (Prep-12) school for boys at Oaklands Parade. In 2017, the school had an enrolment of 1792 students with 150 teachers (147 full-time equivalent) and 129 non-teaching staff (93 full-time equivalent).

Sport
The suburb is home to Eastern Suburbs FC, who play at Heath Park in the Brisbane Premier League.

Transport
Public transport to the suburb is now predominantly provided by regular bus services and frequent CityCat services, which leave from Mowbray Park. The suburb is also an easy walk from the Woolloongabba bus station and the Coorparoo Railway Station.

Notable people
Notable people from or who have lived in East Brisbane include:
 William Baylebridge, a poet and short-story writer
 Johnny Peebles, Australian soccer player and administrator
 Eric Robinson, a politician
 Lydia Tritton, a journalist and public speaker 
 Robert J. Walsh, a medical scientist

References

Further reading

External links

 

 
Suburbs of the City of Brisbane